Karl-Joachim Hürter (born 21 October 1960 in Mayen) is a German former field hockey player who competed in the 1984 Summer Olympics.

References

External links
 

1960 births
Living people
German male field hockey players
Olympic field hockey players of West Germany
Field hockey players at the 1984 Summer Olympics
Olympic silver medalists for West Germany
Olympic medalists in field hockey
Medalists at the 1984 Summer Olympics
People from Mayen
Sportspeople from Rhineland-Palatinate
20th-century German people